Karol Kostrubała (born 12 July 1988) is a Polish former footballer who played as a midfielder. He currently works as a scout for Garbarnia Kraków.

References

External links
 

1988 births
People from Zamość
Sportspeople from Lublin Voivodeship
Living people
Polish footballers
Association football midfielders
MKS Cracovia (football) players
Wisła Płock players
Ząbkovia Ząbki players
KSZO Ostrowiec Świętokrzyski players
Motor Lublin players
Garbarnia Kraków players
Ekstraklasa players
I liga players
II liga players
III liga players